Justina of Padua is a Christian saint and a patroness of Padua. Her feast day is October 7. She is often confused with Justina of Antioch. She was devoted to religion from her earliest years and took the vow of perpetual virginity. When she was brought before Maximian the prefect, she remained firm against all attacks. The prefect caused her to be slain with the sword.

Hagiography
St. Justina of Padua (October 7) was a virgin of noble birth in the city which claims her patronage. Born in Padua about the middle of the first century, her father Vitalian was a rich nobleman and prefect of Padua. Her parents were converted to Christianity by the preaching of Saint Prosdocimo, and not having been blessed with children up to that time, they received Justina in answer to their prayer.

She was devoted to religion from her earliest years and ultimately she took the vow of perpetual virginity. At this time arose the persecutions of the Christians by Nero, and Maximian the prefect who had succeeded Vitalian, proved himself particularly brutal. As Justina would visit the prisons to comfort and encourage the Christians there, Maximian ordered her arrest. While she was passing by the Pont Marin near Padua she was seized by the soldiers. When she was brought before Maximian he was struck by her beauty and endeavoured by every means to shake her constancy. However, she remained firm against all attacks and the prefect caused her to be slain with the sword.  

Medieval texts describe her as a disciple of Saint Peter the Apostle since Saint Prosdocimus, the first bishop of Padua, is said to have been Justina's teacher; his hagiography states that he was sent from Antioch by Peter. This however is chronologically impossible as Justina being a young woman in 304 AD could not have known Prosdocimus as he died in approximately 100 AD.

Veneration
St. Justina is a patron saint of Padua. After St. Mark, she is also a second patroness of Venice. Her feast day is October 7 and coincided with the end of the grape harvest and the time for settling agricultural contracts.

In the 6th century the Paduans dedicated a church to her and she was among the virgin martyrs portrayed in the presbytery arch in the Euphrasian Basilica (at left) and in the procession of virgins in Sant'Apollinare Nuovo. In the 7th century, Venantius Fortunatus, writing in Gaul, urged travellers to Padua to visit her relics there.

The Paduan Basilica and Abbey of Santa Giustina house the Martyrdom of St. Justine by Paolo Veronese. The Abbey complex was founded in the 5th century on Justine's tomb, and in the 15th century became one of the most important monasteries in the area, until it was suppressed by Napoleon in 1810. In 1919 it was reopened. The tombs of several saints are housed in the interior, including those of Justina, Prosdocimus, St. Maximus, St. Urius, St. Felicitas, St. Julian, as well as relics of the Apostle St. Matthias and the Evangelist St. Luke.

Iconography
Justina is represented in Christian Art crowned as a princess, and with a sword transfixing her bosom, in accordance with her martyrdom, AD. 303.

Gallery

See also
 Abbey of Santa Giustina
 Saint Justina of Padua, patron saint archive

References

304 deaths
3rd-century births
Late Ancient Christian female saints
4th-century Christian saints
4th-century Christian martyrs
Year of birth unknown
3rd-century Roman women
4th-century Roman women